Chu Qing (March 1923 – 21 February 2016), born Zhan Yongzhu, was a bureaucrat of the People's Republic of China. She was the widow of General Su Yu.

Biography
Born in Yangzhou, Jiangsu, she began to participate in the revolution in November 1938, and joined the Communist Party of China in March 1939. She served as a secretary in the headquarters in Jiangnan and Subei or New Fourth Army. She also worked in No. 1 division of New Fourth Army, New Fourth Army headquarters in Huanghuatang, East China bureau of CPC's central committee, Jiangsu-Zhejiang Military Region, Central China bureau of CPC's central committee, Central China Military Region, East China Field Army, and CPC's central committee in Jinan City.

She was married to Su Yu on December 26, 1941. She retired from the army in 1952, and became the director of the office of policy study in the Ministry of Commerce. In 1970 she became the senior secretary in the Department of Planning Superintendence at the PLA Academy of Military Science.

Retirement and death
Chu retired in July 1983 and died in Beijing on 21 February 2016. She was predeceased by her husband in 1984, with whom she had two sons Su Rongsheng (粟戎生, b. 1942), Su Hansheng and daughter Su Huining.

References

External links
 Biography of Chu Qing

1923 births
2016 deaths
Politicians from Yangzhou
People's Republic of China politicians from Jiangsu
Chinese Communist Party politicians from Jiangsu
20th-century Chinese women politicians